Heebie Jeebies is a 2013 American science fiction horror film directed by Thomas L. Callaway and written by Trent Haaga. The film stars Robert Belushi, Cathy Shim, Evie Thompson, Olivia Ku, Lucille Soong, Michael Badalucco and Carl Savering.

Plot
In the town of Golderton, crooked businessman Billy Butler (Michael Badalucco), reopens an abandoned gold mine.  It was closed after five miners were trapped in the mine sometime in the 1800s.  Centuries later, Butler, a descendant of the mine's owner, reopens it, unaware of the curse that was cast upon the site.  A creature, a monstrosity composed of the bodies of five deceased miners, awakens with the desire to kill anyone who takes its gold.  Two local policemen (Carl Savering and Robert Belushi) and a coroner (Cathy Shim), whose family has ties to the mine, team up to try to defeat the creature before Golderton becomes a ghost town full of lifeless bodies.

Cast 
Robert Belushi as Todd Crane
Cathy Shim as Theresa Lim
Evie Thompson as Veronica Crane
Olivia Ku as Tracy Lim
Lucille Soong as Zu Mu
Michael Badalucco as Billy Butler
Dave Randolph-Mayhem Davis as Mace
Carl Savering as Sheriff Tatum
Marion Ross as Agnes Whitehead
Jennifer Rubin as Eve Moore 
Kim Collins as Tommy
Tyler Forrest as Rick

Release
Heebie Jeebies premiered on the SyFy Channel on September 9, 2013.

Home media
The film was released on DVD by Sony Pictures on June 25, 2013.

Reception

Debi Moore from Dread Central gave the film a score of 1.5 out of 5, criticizing the film's script, and lack of likable characters. Christopher Armstead from Film Critics United gave the film a mixed review, writing, "It’s not art, not that we know art anyway, and the title is stupid, but Heebie Jeebies was more than functional, low brow, SyFy style entertainment."

References

External links 
 
 
 

2013 television films
2013 films
American television films
American monster movies
American science fiction horror films
2013 horror films
2010s science fiction horror films
2010s monster movies
Films shot in Louisiana
2010s English-language films
2010s American films